{{DISPLAYTITLE:C29H31NO7}}
The molecular formula C29H31NO7 (molar mass: 505.56 g/mol, exact mass: 505.2101 u) may refer to:

 Hernandaline
 Rocaglamide